Edgar Lloyd "Gar" Waddy (3 December 1879 – 2 August 1963) was an Australian cricketer. A a right-handed batsman and wicket-keeper, he played 58 first-class cricket matches, mostly for New South Wales, between 1896 and 1921, scoring 2775 runs and taking two wickets.

Waddy toured New Zealand with the Australian teams in 1913–14 and 1920–21. He played in the two matches against New Zealand on each tour. He made his highest first-class score, 140 in 124 minutes, when he opened the batting in the second match against New Zealand in 1913–14.

He was the father of the Second World War aviator and New South Wales legislator John Lloyd Waddy. Two of his brothers, Ernest Frederick, known as "Mick", and Percival Stacy, known as "Stacy", also played first-class cricket.

See also
 List of New South Wales representative cricketers

References

External links
 
 "Wauchope cricket legend – Edgar Lloyd 'Gar' Waddy"

1879 births
1963 deaths
Australian cricketers
New South Wales cricketers
Sportsmen from New South Wales